is a Japanese footballer currently playing as a midfielder for Ventforet Kofu of J2 League.

Career statistics

Club

Notes

References

External links

1996 births
Living people
Japanese footballers
Association football midfielders
J2 League players
Ventforet Kofu players